Alex Sobczyk (born 20 May 1997) is an Austrian professional footballer who plays for Piast Gliwice as a forward.

Club career
Sobczyk made his Austrian Football First League debut for FC Liefering on 24 July 2015 in a game against Austria Klagenfurt.

References

External links
 

Living people
1997 births
Association football forwards
Footballers from Vienna
Austrian footballers
Austria youth international footballers
Austrian people of Polish descent
2. Liga (Austria) players
Austrian Football Bundesliga players
Slovak Super Liga players
Ekstraklasa players
Cypriot First Division players
FC Liefering players
SK Rapid Wien players
SKN St. Pölten players
SC Wiener Neustadt players
Floridsdorfer AC players
FC Spartak Trnava players
Górnik Zabrze players
Doxa Katokopias FC players
Piast Gliwice players
Austrian expatriate footballers
Expatriate footballers in Slovakia
Expatriate footballers in Poland
Expatriate footballers in Cyprus
Austrian expatriate sportspeople in Slovakia
Austrian expatriate sportspeople in Poland
Austrian expatriate sportspeople in Cyprus